Aspades armatovalva is a species of moth in the family Gelechiidae. It was described by Anthonie Johannes Theodorus Janse in 1963. It is found in Zimbabwe.

References

Pexicopiini
Moths described in 1963
Moths of Africa